The 1976 sterling crisis was a currency crisis in the United Kingdom. Inflation (at close to 25% in 1975, causing high bond yields and borrowing costs), a balance of payments deficit, a public spending deficit, and the 1973 oil crisis were contributors.

The origins of the crisis are traced to the 1972 Conservative "spend for growth" budget that initiated the inflation cycle.  

James Callaghan's Labour government had to borrow $3.9 billion from the International Monetary Fund (IMF), with the intention of maintaining the value of sterling. At the time this was the largest loan ever to have been requested from the IMF.

History 

Initiation of the inflationary cycle is traced to Anthony Barber's 1972 budget which was designed to return the Conservatives to power in an election expected in 1974 or 1975. This budget led to a brief period growth known as "The Barber Boom," followed by a wage-price spiral, high inflation and currency depreciation, culminating in the 1976 sterling crisis. Barber was forced to introduce anti-inflation measures, along with a Price Commission and a Pay Board. The Conservatives lost the 1974 general election to Harold Wilson's Labour Party.

The crisis came to a head during James Callaghan's term as Prime Minister, and caused the Bank of England to withdraw temporarily from the foreign exchange market. After the defeat of the public expenditure white paper in the House of Commons in March 1976 and the resignation of Harold Wilson, many investors became convinced sterling would soon lose value due to inflation. By June 1976, the pound had reached a record low against the dollar.

British ally to Israel during Arab-Israeli Conflicts
In 1967, the Suez Canal closed down for eight years following the Six-Day War of that year, when Israel took and occupied the Sinai Peninsula for 15 years. That triggered the 1967 Oil Embargo, which only lasted a few months. In 1966, the year before it closed, 20% of all world oil cargo tonnage passed through the canal, with most of it heading north for Europe. 

In 1973, the Yom Kippur War was fought, with Egypt crossing the Suez Canal aiming to take back the Sinai Peninsula from Israel. This triggered the 1973 oil crisis and embargo. Britain was an ally to Israel during the Arab–Israeli conflict. The oil crisis presented a severe economic shock to Britain, which it was ill-placed to withstand.

Outcome 
Only half of the loan was actually drawn by the British government and it was repaid by 4 May 1979, the day after the general election. Denis Healey, the Chancellor of the Exchequer at the time, went on to state that the main reason the loan had to be requested was that public sector borrowing requirement figures provided by the Treasury were grossly overstated.

The IMF loan meant that the United Kingdom's economy could be stabilised whilst drastic budget cuts were implemented. Despite the security provided by the loan, the Labour Party had already begun separating into social democratic and more socialist camps, causing bitter rows inside the party and with the trades unions. Some believe the sterling crisis and IMF bailout may have contributed significantly to Margaret Thatcher's 1979 Conservative victory.

See also

 
 
 
 
 Sterling crisis, other currency crises in British history
 
 Closure of the Suez Canal (1967–1975) shortly after the start of the "Six-Day War" or Third Arab–Israeli War

Notes

References

Further reading
Burk, Kathleen. "1976 IMF Crisis." (1989): 39–45.
Ludlam, Steve. "The gnomes of Washington: Four myths of the 1976 IMF crisis." Political Studies 40.4 (1992): 713–727.
Wass, Douglas. Decline to Fall: The Making of British Macro-economic Policy and the 1976 IMF Crisis. Oxford University Press, 2008.

 

1976 in economics
1976 in the United Kingdom
IMF crisis
Economic history of the United Kingdom
International Monetary Fund
History of pound sterling